The Brădești is a left tributary of the river Jiu in Romania. It flows into the Jiu near Beharca.

References

Rivers of Romania
Rivers of Dolj County